Hebrew Academy is a Modern Orthodox Jewish day school in Côte Saint-Luc, Quebec, Canada. The school aims to provide an intensive program of Jewish studies integrated with a strong secular education.

History
Hebrew Academy was founded in 1967 with the merger of the Adath Israel School and the Young Israel Elementary School. The Adath Israel School, situated on Ducharme Street in Outremont, was founded in 1941, while the Young Israel School on Hillsdale Road in Côte-des-Neiges was founded in 1951 as part of the Young Israel movement. Prior to the merger, the Young Israel School had limited facilities and was in need of a high school for its pupils, while the Adath Israel School faced declining enrolment.

Hebrew Academy moved to a rented space on Mackle Road in Côte Saint-Luc in 1979, and established a garderie in 1984. The school purchased the YM-YWHA's building on Kellert Road in 1990, where renovations were completed in 1992.

Academics
In 2006, Hebrew Academy was recognized as a Community Learning Centre by the federal government. Hebrew Academy was ranked 26th in the province in the 2018 Fraser Institute Quebec secondary school rankings.

References

1967 establishments in Quebec
Côte Saint-Luc
Educational institutions established in 1967
Elementary schools in Montreal
High schools in Montreal
Jewish day schools
Jewish schools in Canada
Jews and Judaism in Montreal
Modern Orthodox Jewish day schools
Private schools in Quebec